Where a device needs a username and/or password to log in, a default password is usually provided that allows the device to be accessed during its initial setup, or after resetting to factory defaults.

Manufacturers of such equipment typically use a simple password, such as admin or password on all equipment they ship, in the expectation that users will change the password during configuration.  The default username and password is usually found in the instruction manual (common for all devices) or on the device itself.

Default passwords are one of the major contributing factors to large-scale compromises of home routers. Leaving such a password on devices available to the public is a major security risk.

Some devices (such as wireless routers) will come with unique default router username and passwords printed on a sticker, which is more secure than a common default password. Some vendors will however derive the password from the device's MAC address using a known algorithm, in which case the password can be also easily reproduced by attackers.

Default access 

To access internet-connected devices on a network, a user must know its default IP address. Manufacturers typically use 192.168.1.1 or 10.0.0.1 as default router IP addresses. However, some will have variations on this. Similarly to login details, leaving this unchanged can lead to security issues.

See also 
 Backdoor (computing)
 Internet of things
 Cyber-security regulation

References 

Password authentication
Computer security exploits